Huánuco is a department and region in central Peru. It is bordered by the La Libertad, San Martín, Loreto and Ucayali regions in the north, the Ucayali Region in the east, the Pasco Region in the south and the Lima and Ancash regions in the west. Its capital is the city Huánuco.

Huánuco has a rough topography comprising parts of the Sierra and the High Jungle (mountain rim) regions. Being equidistant from the north and the south of the country, it has the privilege of having a mild weather with an average annual temperature of 20 °C (68 °F).

This region is important for its geographical location, history, and for the richness of its land, where the presence of man goes back to ancient times. El Hombre de Lauricocha (Man of Lauricocha) is among the most distinctive examples, dating from 10,000 BC, as well as Kotosh, where vestiges of the oldest settlement in the Americas (4200 BC) took place.

Several ethnic groups inhabited this region. However, after a severe resistance, they started to incorporate as part of the Inca empire. Huánuco then became part of the Cusco-Cajamarca-Cusco route.

In the beginning of the 19th century, during the emancipation process, Huánuco was one of the first cities to promote Peru's independence. Moreover, a first oath took place in this city on December 15, 1820, after several uprisings in Huamalíes, Huallanca and Ambo.

Political division

The region is divided into 11 provinces (singular: provincia), which are composed of 75 districts (distritos, singular: distrito).

The provinces, with their capitals in parentheses, are:

 Ambo (Ambo)
 Dos de Mayo (La Unión)
 Huacaybamba (Huacaybamba)
 Huamalíes (Llata)
 Huánuco (Huánuco)
 Lauricocha (Jesús)
 Leoncio Prado (Tingo María)
 Marañón (Huacrachuco)
 Pachitea (Panao)
 Puerto Inca (Puerto Inca)
 Yarowilca (Chavinillo)

Demographics

Languages 
According to the 2007 Peru Census, the language learned first by most of the residents was Spanish (70.92%) followed by Quechua (28.56%). The Quechua variety spoken in Huánuco is Huánuco Quechua. The following table shows the results concerning the language learnt first in the Huánuco Region by province:

Places of interest 
 Awkillu Waqra
 Awkimarka
 El Sira Communal Reserve
 Qillqay Mach'ay
 Huayhuash mountain range

References

External links
Noticias de la Región
Official web site of the Huánuco region

 
Regions of Peru